SS Ralph Izard was a Liberty ship built in the United States during World War II. She was named after Ralph Izard, an American politician. He was appointed commissioner to the Court of Tuscany by the Continental Congress in 1776, but was recalled in 1779. He returned to America in 1780, and pledged his large estate in South Carolina, for the payment of war ships to be used in the American Revolutionary War. He was a member of the Continental Congress in 1782 and 1783. In 1788, he was elected to the United States Senate and served from March 4, 1789, to March 4, 1795, serving as President pro tempore of the United States Senate during the Third Congress.

Construction
Ralph Izard was laid down on 1 August 1942, under a Maritime Commission (MARCOM) contract, MCE hull 914, by the Bethlehem-Fairfield Shipyard, Baltimore, Maryland; she was sponsored by Mrs. Charles E. Keys, the wife of a yard employee, and was launched on 12 September 1942.

History
She was allocated to American Foreign Steamship Corporation, on 23 September 1942. On 5 September 1947, she was laid up in the National Defense Reserve Fleet, Mobile, Alabama. On 11 February 1965, she was sold for scrapping to Union Minerals & Alloys Corp., for $48,225.89. She was removed from the fleet on 11 March 1965.

References

Bibliography

 
 
 
 

 

Liberty ships
Ships built in Baltimore
1942 ships
Mobile Reserve Fleet